The Jolly Coopers is a pub at 16 High Street, Hampton TW12 2SJ in the London Borough of Richmond upon Thames.

It is a Grade II listed building, dating back to the 18th century.

References

External links
 
 

18th-century establishments in England
Grade II listed buildings in the London Borough of Richmond upon Thames
Grade II listed pubs in London
Pubs in the London Borough of Richmond upon Thames